John Ward Armstrong (30 September 1915 – 21 July 1987) was an Irish Anglican bishop and served as Archbishop of Armagh from 1980 to 1986,

Education and priestly ministry

Armstrong was born in Belfast, the eldest of four sons (there were no daughters) of John Armstrong, a Belfast corporation official, and his wife, Elizabeth Ward. He was educated at the Belfast Royal Academy and Trinity College, Dublin. He was ordained deacon in 1938, and his first position was at All Saints Church, Grangegorman. He was ordained priest on 24 December 1939. He was the clerical vicar at Christ Church Cathedral, Dublin and then Dean's Vicar at St Patrick's Cathedral, Dublin until 1944. He was then rector of Christ Church, Leeson Park, Dublin until he became the Dean of St Patrick's.

Episcopal ministry

Armstrong served as Bishop of Cashel and Waterford from 1968 to 1977, Bishop of Cashel and Ossory from 1977 to 1980.  His translation to the See of Armagh in 1980 catapulted him into the fraught world of Northern Irish politics, a deteriorating security situation and the heightened community tensions of the Hunger Strikes and later still, the Anglo-Irish Agreement.

Along with fellow Church of Ireland bishops he regularly met political leaders to offer analysis and informed opinion: government minutes of some of those meetings have now been released.   These meetings took place with political leaders in both jurisdictions on the island and Armstrong often led delegations to Dublin for talks.

He formed such a warm and effective working relationship with his Armagh neighbour Cardinal Tomas O'Fiach that when he announced his retirement, it was recorded his successor Robin Eames was regarded - by comparison - as a "cold fish".

He retired in February 1986 at the age of 70 and spent his short retirement in Skerries, Co. Dublin.    He died in July 1987.

References

1915 births
Anglican archbishops of Armagh
People educated at the Belfast Royal Academy
Alumni of Trinity College Dublin
20th-century Anglican archbishops in Ireland
Deans of St. Patrick's Cathedral, Dublin
Bishops of Cashel and Ossory
Bishops of Cashel and Waterford
1987 deaths